The 1953 Western Reserve Red Cats football team represented the Western Reserve University in the American city of Cleveland, Ohio, now known as Case Western Reserve University, during the 1953 college football season.  The Red Cats were a member of the Mid-American Conference (MAC).

The team was coached by Edward L. Finnigan and assisted by Wes Stevens. A notable player was captain fullback Gordon McCarter.

The final Thanksgiving Day rivalry game against Case Tech was played this season.

Schedule

References

Western Reserve
Case Western Reserve Spartans football seasons
Western Reserve Red Cats football